London Stadium (formerly and also known as Olympic Stadium and the Stadium at Queen Elizabeth Olympic Park) is a multi-purpose outdoor stadium at Queen Elizabeth Olympic Park in the Stratford district of London. The stadium was constructed specifically for the 2012 Summer Olympics and 2012 Summer Paralympics, serving as the track-and-field venue and as the site of their opening and closing ceremonies. Following the Games, it was renovated for multi-purpose use, and it now serves primarily as the home of Premier League club West Ham United.

Land preparation for the stadium began in mid-2007, with the construction officially starting on 22 May 2008. The stadium held its first public event in March 2012, serving as the finish line for a celebrity run organised by the National Lottery. Holding 80,000 for the Olympics and the Paralympics, it re-opened in July 2016 with 66,000 seats, but with capacity for football limited to 60,000 under the terms of the lease. The decision to make West Ham United the main tenants was controversial, with the initial tenancy process having to be rerun.

The stadium hosted the 2017 IAAF World Championships and 2017 World Para Athletics Championships (the first time both events were held in the same location in the same year). It hosts a round of the IAAF Diamond League each year, known as the London Grand Prix, sometimes called the London Anniversary Games. It also hosted several 2015 Rugby World Cup matches. The stadium can also hold concerts with up to 80,000 spectators and, due to its oval shape and relocatable seating, was deemed to have the potential to host other sports such as baseball and cricket. In June 2019, it hosted the first regular-season U.S. Major League Baseball game in Europe, in which the Boston Red Sox played a two-game series against the New York Yankees.

Design and construction

Olympic design

Design brief
During London's bid for the games, promotional materials featured a main stadium with a roof "designed to wrap itself around the venue like muscles supporting the body"; however, at that time there had been no formal design brief agreed. While the bidding process was ongoing, West Ham had talks with the ODA about contributing to the development of a multi-purpose stadium, should London win the bid. The government preferred to produce a brief for an athletics-only stadium that would be largely disassembled after the games, with the lower tier remaining in place as a permanent athletics facility to replace the Crystal Palace National Sports Centre. With the original Olympic design finalised and being built, the government had a change of heart, and a bidding process was launched for post-Olympic tenants.

On 13 October 2006, the London Organising Committee of the Olympic and Paralympic Games (LOCOG) confirmed that it had selected Sir Robert McAlpine and Populous with whom to start exclusive negotiations to fulfil the eventual design-and-build contract of the new Olympic Stadium after no other organisations met the bidding criteria. The stadium design was launched on 7 November 2007.

Original structure details
Construction of the stadium commenced three months early in May 2008, after the bowl of the structure had been excavated and the area cleared. The building of the stadium was completed in March 2011 reportedly on time and under budget, with the athletics track laid in October 2011.

The stadium's track-and-field arena is excavated out of the soft clay found on the site, around which is permanent seating for 25,000, built using concrete "rakers". The natural slope of the land is incorporated into the design, with warm-up and changing areas dug into a semi-basement position at the lower end. Spectators enter the stadium via a podium level, which is aligned with the top of the permanent seating bowl. A lightweight demountable steel and pre-cast concrete upper tier was built up from this "bowl" to accommodate a further 55,000 spectators.

The stadium is made up of different tiers; during the Games, the stadium was able to hold 80,000 spectators. The base tier, which allows for 25,000 seats, is a sunken elliptical bowl that is made up of low-carbon-dioxide concrete; this contains 40 per cent less embodied carbon than conventional concrete. There are a mixture of driven cast in situ piles, continuous flight auger piles, and vibro concrete columns. In addition to the minimal use of steel, which makes it 75 per cent lighter, the stadium also uses high-yield large diameter pipes that were surplus on completion of North Sea gas pipeline projects in its compression truss, recycled granite, and many of the building products were transported using trains and barges rather than by lorry.

A wrap, funded by Dow Chemical Company to be able to advertise on it until 26 June 2012, covered the exterior during the Olympics. The wrap was made from polyester and polyethene and printed using UV curable inks. The final design for the wrap consisted of  fabric panels, twisted at 90-degree angles to allow entry to the stadium at the bottom of the structure, and held in place with tensioned cables.

To allow for fast on-site assembly, compression truss and roof column connections were bolted; this enabled easy disassembling of the roof structure after the closing ceremonies. The cable-supported roof structure covered approximately two-thirds of the stadium's seating. The lights were first officially switched on in December 2010 by Prime Minister David Cameron and London Mayor Boris Johnson. During the games, the towers were fitted with additional ceremony lighting, and four of towers held large temporary video screens.

Stadium interior
The stadium was equipped with a nine lane Mondo  athletics track. The turf in the stadium was grown in Scunthorpe and was a mix of perennial ryegrass, smooth stalk meadow grass, and fescue grass seeds. It took 360 rolls of grass to cover the infield and was laid in March 2011. The track was designed by Italian company Mondo and when installed was their latest version of the Mondotrack FTX.

The stadium's 80,000 seats had a black-and-white 'fragment' theme that matched the overall branding design used by LOCOG for London 2012. The lines all centred on the finish line on the track. The seats were made in Luton and were fitted between May and December 2010. During the Games, the Stadium's grandstands contained a lighting system developed by Tait Technologies that allowed them to function as a giant video screen. Individual "paddles" containing nine LED pixels each were installed between each seat, which were controlled via a central system to display video content wrapped around the stadium. The system was primarily intended for use during the ceremonies of the Olympics and Paralympics. This technology was also adopted for the Pyeongchang Olympic Stadium, which hosted the 2018 Winter Olympics.

Playing surface 
It used two vulcanised rubber layers, one of which was a cushioning underside with elongated diamond-shaped cells, which allowed them to flex in any direction. During the four London 2012 ceremonies, the track was protected via synthetic covering. For the stadium's transformation, the track was protected from construction work for the 2015 events by covering it with a plastic sheet layer and burying it under  of soil. The Mondotrack surface was removed in early 2016 and a new surface, using  of the improved Mondotrack/WS, was laid that May. Some of the original running track, mostly from the home straight, was kept so that it could be sold and auctioned to the public to raise money for the operation of the stadium and its neighbouring community track. The grass playing field was lengthened by several metres at either end for the 2015 rugby matches to fit a suitably-sized rugby/football pitch. In football configuration, the pitch is surrounded by artificial turf and carpeting that covers the exposed sections of the running track.

Response
Initially, the stadium design received a mixed response from the media, with reviews ranging from "magnificent" to the derisory "bowl of blancmange". The design was promoted as an example of "sustainable development", but some architecture critics have questioned both its aesthetic value and suitability as a national icon – especially when compared with Beijing National Stadium. For example, Ellis Woodman, Building Designs architecture critic, said of the design: "The principle of it being dismountable is most welcome... it demonstrates an obvious interest in establishing an economy of means and as such is the antithesis of the 2008 Olympic stadium in Beijing. But while that's an achievement, it's not an architectural achievement. In design terms what we're looking at is pretty underwhelming." He went on to criticise the procurement and design processes – stating of the latter that it should have been subject to an architectural competition. This view was echoed by Tom Dyckhoff, The Times'''s architecture critic, who described the design as "tragically underwhelming" and commented that the "architecture of the 2008 and 2012 Olympics will, in years to come, be seen by historians as a "cunning indicator of the decline of the West and the rise of the East".
Despite the criticism, the Olympic Stadium was nominated for the 2012 Stirling Prize in architecture losing out to the Sainsbury Laboratory at the University of Cambridge.

Amanda Baillieu writing in Building Design challenged the designer's claims that the stadium is environmentally sustainable and good value for money. Instead, it is asserted that the reality will be the opposite. In particular, she claimed that:
 the temporary roof could not be reused to cover the permanent 25,000 seating area given the difference in size.
 it is unlikely that the removed seating would be wanted for any other event e.g., the Glasgow Commonwealth Games; and
 the costs involved in dismantling the stadium—and surrounding "pods"—has not been factored into the estimated cost.
The cost was £537 million, as compared with the 1908 Olympic Stadium cost of £60,000 (£5.6 million in 2010).

Stadium island

The stadium site is on former industrial land between the River Lea (which rejoins the Navigation below Old Ford Lock), the City Mill River, and the Old Pudding Mill River, parts of the Bow Back Rivers. Another branch of this system, St Thomas' Creek,  to the south, completes an "island" surrounded by water.  to the east is the Waterworks River; with the London Aquatics Centre on its eastern bank. This "island" site for the stadium lies at the southern end of the Olympic Park. To make room for its construction, the already partially obstructed Pudding Mill River, a short channel of the Lea that ran from the west side of the stadium south-eastwards across the site, was filled in.

Post-Olympic redevelopment
Dennis Hone, chief executive of the LLDC, revealed in November 2012 that the stadium would not meet its reopening deadline of 2014. Instead, it would reopen in August 2015 and retain a capacity of around 50,000 for athletic events. Following the granting, in March 2013, of a 99-year tenancy to West Ham United, the E20 LLP, a joint organisation by the London Legacy Development Corporation and Newham Council were specifically set-up to oversee the redevelopment of the stadium into a UEFA Category 4 venue seating 66,000 spectators. The reconfiguration saw work on a new roof, corporate areas, toilets, concessions and retractable seating. West Ham contributed £15 million and Newham Council £40 million for the work to be carried out with the LLDC and the British Government making up the rest. Approval was granted for the installation of retractable seating on all sides of the stadium and an  transparent roof.

Balfour Beatty were initially contracted to construct the new roof for £41 million; in January 2014 they were awarded a £154 million tender, which includes the earlier contract for the roof, to complete the stadium's transformation works. Imtech G&H were awarded a £25 million contract to carry out electrical and plumbing work. Paul Kelso, working for Sky News, discovered in September 2014 that the cost of the conversion of the stadium may rise by £15 million, due to additional work to strengthen the structure, to allow it to support the new roof. It was revealed neither West Ham United nor the taxpayer would have to meet the additional cost as Balfour Beatty would contribute with the remainder funded from the existing LLDC transformation budget of the Olympic Park. In October 2014, the LLDC contributed a further £35.9 million towards the project with the funding coming from reserves and income generated by other means.

Work commenced on 13 August 2013 with the removal of 25,000 seats and the grass from the field of play. The athletics track was covered with a  layer of recycled concrete to protect it during the heavy lifting. In November 2013 work commenced to remove the fourteen floodlight panels as part of the £200 million conversion of the stadium. In March 2015 work began on installing the 14 new floodlights. As the floodlight work began, work on a steel halo structure that encircles the stadium, containing 96 turnstiles, catering and toilet facilities, concluded.

The black-and-white seating design from the Olympics was replaced with a white, blue and claret design. The new design includes West Ham's name on the East Kop Stand and symbolic crossed hammers on all lower-tier stands, and the retention of the 2012 shard design on the upper tier, albeit in new colouring to match the stadium's anchor tenant. Work continued through 2016 to transform the stadium into a home for West Ham, with the club's colours and giant model West Ham shirts added to the stadium concourse. A West Ham store and coffee shop was opened on 23 June. In February 2019, it was announced that the East Stand would be renamed in honour of Billy Bonds. In an attempt to make the London Stadium more like their home ground, in April 2019 a £250,000 claret-coloured pitch surround was announced and installed. In March 2020, West Ham opened a sensory room in the stadium for fans.

Community track
Following the demolition of the 2012 warm-up track and to comply with IAAF rules requiring one at Construction Category 1 facilities, a new six-lane community track (eight-lane on the straights) has been created immediately adjacent to the south of the stadium. Since 2017, the track is home to Newham and Essex Beagles Athletic Club and is open for around 250days of the year. The construction of the track was funded by a grant from the London Marathon Trust.

History
London 2012
 The Olympic Stadium hosted its first public event on 31 March 2012, serving as the finish line for the National Lottery Olympic Park Run. Five thousand participants (including celebrities, British athletes and members of the public who won a lottery draw) took part in a  run around Olympic Park. Participants entered the Olympic Stadium to the theme from Chariots of Fire to run the final  on its track. The stadium hosted two warm-up events for the London 2012 Olympic and Paralympic Games as part of the London Prepares series. The venue hosted the British Universities Athletics Championships and the London Disability Grand Prix in May 2012. On 5 May around 40,000 people attended an event entitled "2012 Hours to Go: An Evening of Athletics and Entertainment". The evening was hosted by Gabby Logan and Vernon Kay. The special guests joining Logan and Kay were Jon Culshaw, Melanie C, Hugh Bonneville, Chipmunk, and Jack Whitehall. Niamh Clarke-Willis, a nine-year-old, was chosen to open the stadium ceremonially. During the London Disability Grand Prix, Paul Blake (T36, 1500 metres), Hannah Cockroft (T34, 100 metres), Michael McKillop (T37, 1500 metres), and Richard Whitehead (T42, 200 metres) all set new world records. The stadium also hosted the athletics events of the UK School Games.

The stadium hosted both the opening and closing ceremonies at the 2012 Olympic Games. During the Athletics events of the Olympic Games, David Rudisha broke his own world record for the 800 metres to become the first man to run the distance in under 1 minute 41 seconds. In the 4 × 100 metres relay the team from Jamaica also broke their own world record from the 2011 World Championships by two-tenths of a second. The United States women's 4×100 metres team beat the previous best set by East Germany in 1985, recording a time of 40.82 seconds to set a new world record.

The stadium also hosted both the opening and closing ceremonies of the 2012 Paralympic Games. Over the course of the Paralympic Games athletics events, world records were set on the track by; Oxana Boturchuk Martina Caironi, Chen Junfei, El Amin Chentouf, China, Libby Clegg, Arnu Fourie, Marie-Amelie le Fur, Terezinha Guilhermina, Mahmoud Khaldi, Samwel Mushai Kimani, Walid Ktila. Liang Yongbin, Rosemary Little, Liu Ping, Liu Wenjun, Gunther Matzinger, Michael McKillop, Mateusz Michalski, Yohansson Nascimento, Oscar Pistorius, David Prince, Evgenii Shvetcov, South Africa, Leo Pekka Tahti, Abraham Tarbei, Iurii Tsaruk, Richard Whitehead, Abderrahim Zhiou, Zhu Daqing, and Zhou Guohua. Multiple World Records on the track were set by Yunidis Castillo, Assia El Hannouni, Evan O'Hanlon, Jason Smyth, Fanie van der Merwe, and Marlou van Rhijn.

In the field events, world records were set by Hani Alnakhli, Alexey Ashapatov, Aigars Apinis Lahouari Bahlaz, Mohamed Berrahal, Kelly Cartwright, Yanlong Fu, Leonardo Diaz, Zeljko Dimitrijevic, Tanja Dragic, Najat El Garraa, Javad Hardani, Todd Hodgetts, Jun Wang, Maroua Ibrahmi, Juan Yao, Mohsen Kaedi, Mohammad Khalvandi, Gocha Khugaev, Karolina Kucharczyk, Assunta Legnante, Maciej Lepiato, Liu Fuliang, Drazenko Mitrovic, Azeddine Nouiri, Katarzyna Piekart, Mariia Pomazan, Nikita Prokhorov, Qing Wu, Markus Rehm, Raoua Tlili, Wang Yanzhang, Zhu Pengkai, and Oksana Zubkovska. Multiple records were set in the field by Dong Xia, Birgit Kober, Na Mi, Yang Liwan, and Wang Zhiming.

Bidding and award for post-Olympics use
The decision on how to use the stadium after the Olympics went through two rounds of bidding: the first was rejected on 11 October 2011, after concerns had emerged about European Union competition law and particularly the risk of illegal state aid.

First tenancy process
The Olympic Park Legacy Company (OPLC) set five criteria: that the new tenant should produce a viable long-term solution that provided value for money, secure a partner with the expertise to operate a legacy solution, reopen the stadium as quickly as possible, allow flexible usage, and make the stadium a distinctive physical symbol that supported regeneration. After receiving and pre-screening over 100 expressions of interest, the formal bidding process of selecting the post-Olympics user of the stadium opened on 18 August 2010. It ran until 30 September, after which the OPLC drew up a shortlist, to select a tenant by the end of the financial year (31 March 2011).

On 12 November 2010, it was announced that two bids had been shortlisted for the stadium post-Olympics. They were a joint bid from Tottenham Hotspur and Anschutz Entertainment Group (AEG), and a second bid from West Ham United and Newham Council.

Bids
The legacy plan for the stadium had involved converting it into a 25,000- to 30,000-seat athletics stadium with a sports training, science and medicine centre after the 2012 Paralympics. Media reports, however, suggested that several potential tenants were interested in moving to the stadium after the games. Media speculation and expressions of interest that did not result in bids included: the England and Wales Cricket Board and Kent County Cricket Club; Middlesex County Cricket Club, Essex County Cricket Club: Wasps RFC; Saracens R.F.C.; London Skolars R.L.F.C.; Major League Baseball; the National Football League, which had been looking at the potential of a franchise in London; and Leyton Orient F.C.

Bid 1: AEG and Tottenham Hotspur
These joint bidders had each separately expressed interest in the venue but submitted a joint bid. AEG is the company that redeveloped the loss-making Millennium Dome exhibition venue in Southeast London into the profitable music venue The O2. On 26 July 2010, it was rumoured that Tottenham might be interested in taking over the stadium after the Games. The club had plans to build a new stadium adjacent to their then-current ground as part of the Northumberland Development Project (which eventually came to fruition in 2019), but the planning application and the funding for that development were proving difficult for the club, making the Olympic Stadium a viable option.

Bid 2: Newham Council and West Ham United
After the acquisition of West Ham United in 2010 by David Gold and David Sullivan, the new owners expressed their desire to make the stadium the club's new home. With Mayor Boris Johnson expressing his desire for a football club to take over it after the 2012 Olympics and Paralympics, this seemed the most likely option. At the opening of the formal bid process, West Ham United were considered favourites once they withdrew their initial opposition to keeping the running track in place, as well as planning a £100 million conversion to create a 66,000 capacity venue, which would also host international football, international athletics, as well as Essex County Cricket Club, international Twenty20 cricket matches, NFL games, and Live Nation events.

Decision, review, and cancellation
On 11 February 2011, the Olympic Park Legacy Company (OPLC) unanimously selected West Ham United and Newham Council as the preferred bidders to take over the stadium after the 2012 Games. But Leyton Orient, a lower league team who are geographically the nearest professional football club to the London Stadium, complained that as it was so close to their own ground, West Ham's occupancy of it would breach F.A. rules and could even force them into bankruptcy. On 3 March 2011, West Ham United's proposed move to the stadium was approved by the British Government and London Mayor Boris Johnson.

Tottenham Hotspur F.C. and Leyton Orient F.C. applied for a judicial review to overturn the Olympic Park Legacy Company's (OPLC) decision; however, this appeal was rejected in June 2011. Tottenham Hotspur appealed the decision not to have a review on 29 June 2011. The OPLC announced on 5 July 2011 that an independent review into the awarding of the Olympic Park Stadium to West Ham United was to be carried out following the discovery on 30 June 2011 that an employee, Dionne Knight had been engaged by West Ham United to carry out consultancy work relating to the stadium without permission of the OPLC. Knight had already declared to the OPLC that she was in a personal relationship with a director of West Ham United, and was suspended whilst a possible conflict of interest was investigated. On 22 August 2011, the independent investigation ruled that the process was not compromised and thus the bid process will not be reopened. On 23 August, the day before Tottenham Hotspur were due in court, they staged "intense negotiations" with the office of the Mayor of London, and looked set to drop all claims for a review and be offered funding for their own stadium. However, the next day Tottenham did attend court despite being close to striking a deal. Tottenham and Leyton Orient won a review of the decision, being told that they had an arguable case. The review was scheduled to take place on 18 October 2011. Even if Tottenham abandoned the review, due to being granted a new stadium as part of their Northumberland Development Project, Orient were expected to continue, with its owner Barry Hearn calling the decision to grant a review "a great day for the little man". However, the bid was later cancelled before the review was completed, due to a series of concerns regarding EU laws.

Second tenancy process
Once the original deal collapsed a new process to select a tenant was begun. The athletics legacy clause was clarified to ensure that a track remained in the stadium. West Ham immediately announced plans to become tenants. On 17 October 2011, a day before they were due in court for the judicial review to start into the original bidding process, Tottenham Hotspur ended their legal challenge about the original decision to award the stadium to West Ham United. This marked Spurs' end to their interest in the stadium. On 18 October, Leyton Orient submitted an application to the English Football League for permission for a move to the stadium. Chairman Barry Hearn said, "We are asking for a 25,000-seater stadium and we want to see if we can get around the athletics track. It has to stay, we know that. But can we build up, if not down, and see if it's possible to get it covered while we play?".

In February 2012, 16 parties were interested in the stadium. In July 2012, four bidders were announced:
 West Ham United
 Intelligent Transport Services, in conjunction with Formula One.
 University College of Football Business (UCFB), an affiliate of Bucks New University.
 Essex County Cricket Club with the University of East London.

In April 2012, the Olympic Park Legacy Company was dismantled, and responsibilities transferred to the newly constituted London Legacy Development Corporation (LLDC). Daniel Moylan, chairman of the LLDC, was removed by Mayor Boris Johnson on 12 September 2012, after having made changes to the leadership of the organisation that annoyed some Board members. Johnson took on the chairmanship of the corporation himself.

In December 2012, West Ham were named as the preferred bidder for the stadium with a separate operator co-ordinating community and sporting use, as well as concerts and events. Leyton Orient's bid was rejected due to its commercial viability and the bid from Intelligent Transport Services, in conjunction with Formula One, was rejected for having too much speculation and uncertainty in their business plan. However, with so much public money going into the stadium and its redevelopment, the BBC learned that David Gold and David Sullivan must share any profits they make if they sell the club. West Ham were given three months to improve the terms of their deal or lose the stadium; with Johnson going with plan B without football. The two parties seemed to find common ground in February 2013, with West Ham, reportedly, agreeing to pay £2.5 million in rent per year. They additionally promised to pay back any extra cost for the roof and seats within ten years. Gold stated at the beginning of March that a deal could be complete by the middle of the month. On 22 March 2013, West Ham United secured a 99-year lease deal, with the stadium planned to be used as their home ground from the 2016–17 season. In July 2013, UK Athletics received a 50-year deal for the use of the stadium. UK Athletics will have access every year from the last Friday in June until the end of July.

On 6 March, Barry Hearn of Leyton Orient stated that he would mount another legal challenge as he believed the rules set out by the LLDC had not been followed. Hearn also said he felt Leyton Orient's proposed ground share had been ignored and not properly explored. In April 2013, he was informed that his call for a judicial review had been rejected. An oral application was submitted in June 2013. On 19 September 2013, Leyton Orient lost their bid to win a judicial review into the decision to grant West Ham the tenancy of the Olympic Stadium. At the High Court, Mr Justice Lewis said the LLDC was entitled to make the decision which was not "irrational". In November 2013, it was the House of Lords' opinion that Leyton Orient should be allowed occasional use of the stadium, with Lord Harris telling Orient and West Ham to "stop squabbling like children." Dennis Hone stated that he was in talks with Barry Hearn over occasional usage, but that it would not mean a permanent groundshare. In early December, the LLDC said that there was nothing to stop Orient from negotiating a rental agreement with whichever firm ends up running the stadium. Orient, however, would not be able to negotiate a 99-year deal like West Ham and would only have usage of the stadium when the Hammers are not playing. On 1 July 2014, Leyton Orient brought an end to their dispute with the Premier League regarding the future use of the stadium, after a confidential agreement between the two parties was reached.

Supporters of various rival clubs pressed for an inquiry into the LLDC's granting of West Ham's tenancy, arguing that West Ham were being given an unfair advantage by the arrangement. However, in September 2015 the government rejected holding such an inquiry. In October 2015, the LLDC released a 207-page document with redacted sections. West Ham's annual rent was not revealed as this was seen to be commercially sensitive information. On 14 April 2016, it was revealed that West Ham will pay £2.5 million per year during a 99-year lease of the stadium but will not have to fund police, stewarding, heating, pitch maintenance, or corner flags. Barry Hearn described the deal as one his dog could have bettered.

In September 2018, Lyn Garner, chief executive of the London Legacy Development Corporation, revealed that the £2.5m paid per year by West Ham did not even cover the cost of staging matches leading to increased debts in running the stadium for the 97-year remainder of their tenancy agreement. The LLDC had established a commercial subsidiary, E20, as landlords for the Stadium. E20 through their appointment of a stadium operator provide for all matchday stewarding, catering, cleaning, fabric and maintenance services – albeit that they profited through the bulk of franchise fees from catering concessions and bars. E20 and West Ham became embroiled in a protracted legal dispute in the High Court as to which elements of service were included in the annual payments under the 99-year lease, and which elements might be expected to involve an additional regular facility fee (with particular reference to West Ham wishing to replace the covering to the athletics track with one in club colours). Due to the dispute, E20 refused to open discussions on allowing the usable capacity of the stadium to increase to its full potential of seats unless these disputes were resolved to their satisfaction. However, in November 2018, both parties agreed to an out-of-court settlement, under which the annual lease payment would be uplifted as the usable capacity increased towards 66,000.

Stadium operator
In October 2014, The Evening Standard reported that French company Vinci SA were favourites to be given a contract to run the stadium for ten years. The company which already operates several other stadiums, including the Stade de France in Paris, had reportedly beaten off competition from other companies including Anschutz Entertainment Group who run The O2. In February 2015, Vinci Stadium, a subsidiary of Vinci Concessions, were appointed to manage it starting in April 2015 for a 25-year period. The company are also be responsible for the London Marathon Charitable Trust Community Track and events on the south park lawn. This is the first stadium outside France to be managed by Vinci. Vinci set up a subsidiary company called London Stadium 185 (LS185), with the 185 signifying how many medals were won by British athletes at the London Olympic and Paralympic Games. In January 2019, the London Legacy Development Corporation bought LS185 from Vinci and kept all the existing staff in place after concerns were raised in regards to costs at the venue, as it turned in a £3.5million loss the previous year.

Sports
Although West Ham United are the primary tenants, the stadium's operators arrange many other events to take place there.

Athletics

Anniversary Games

On 24 January 2013, it was confirmed that the London Athletics Grand Prix, a Diamond League event, would be switched to the stadium. In February 2013, it was announced that it would also hold a Paralympic athletics event on 28 July. In April Sainsbury's were announced as sponsors and the event was renamed the "Anniversary Games". At the event, David Weir set a world record for the T54 mile.

The London Grand Prix was scheduled to move permanently to the stadium in 2016. However, due to the 2015 Rugby World Cup taking place in the stadium, using the original seating configuration, the opportunity came to move the Grand Prix to the stadium a year early, again under the name of the Anniversary Games. During the 2015 events national records were set by Dafne Schippers (100 m), Dina Asher-Smith (100 m), Shara Proctor (long jump), while Georgina Hermitage (400 m T37) and Sophie Hahn (100 m T38) set world records.

The Muller Anniversary Games, the fourth-anniversary event, took place in the stadium on 22–23 July 2016. The IPC Grand Prix events were incorporated alongside Diamond League events on the second day of the meet. At the event, Kendra Harrison broke the women's 100m hurdles world record, a time which has existed for 28 years.

The 2017 Muller Anniversary Games was shortened to a one-day event on Sunday 9 July 2017. Its move to an earlier time of the month was due to the 2017 World Athletics Championships

The 2018 edition returned to a two-day event on its typical weekend of 21–22 July. Tom Bosworth set a world record in the 3000 metres walk. Kare Adenegan and Sophie Hahn set world record times in the T34 100m and T38 200m events. While Sifan Hassan set a Diamond League record in the women's mile.

The 2019 event was held on 20–21 July.

The 2020 event was scheduled to take place earlier on the 4–5 July. However, the event was cancelled due to the COVID-19 pandemic.

The 2021 event, scheduled to be reduced to a single day and take place on 13 July was not held at the stadium. No event was held in 2022 either due to the UEFA Women's Euro 2022 and the Commonwealth Games.

After a three-year hiatus, the event would return to the London Stadium as a single day event on 23 July 2023.

2017 World Athletics and World Para Athletics Championships
London had bid to host the 2015 World Athletics Championships using the Olympic Stadium. It went up against Beijing's Olympic Stadium and the Polish city of Chorzów. However, the stadium had to withdraw its bid due to uncertainties arising out of the timing of the announcement of who would operate it after the Olympics, thus gifting Beijing the championships. With issues resolved over its future, London again used the stadium to bid for the 2017 World Athletics Championships. The bid was made official in August with Lord Coe personally submitting the bid a few weeks later at the 2011 World Athletic Championships in Daegu which was supported by London's Mayor Boris Johnson and the British Government. On 11 November 2011, the IAAF officially awarded the 2017 World Championships to London. The World Para Athletics Championships (formerly the IPC Athletics World Championships) were planned to take place a month before the able-bodied event and were formally confirmed for the stadium in December 2012. The 2017 able-bodied athletics event was the final track championship for Mo Farah and Usain Bolt.

The World Para Athletics Championships were held between 14 and 23 July 2017, with 800,000 tickets available across 16 sessions. The IAAF World Championships followed between 4–13 August 2017 with 700,000 tickets available. 3,300 athletes from 200 countries competed for 690 medals across 245 events.

2018 Athletics World Cup
In February 2018, London Stadium was announced as the venue for the inaugural Athletics World Cup. The event was held on 14 and 15 July.

Football

West Ham United play at this stadium, having moved from their former Boleyn Ground in August 2016. West Ham sold out the 50,000 season ticket allocation for the stadium by May 2016 for the 2016–17 season.

The opening game for West Ham was a Europa League match against NK Domžale on 4 August 2016, which West Ham won 3–0 with the stadium sold out, albeit with a reduced capacity of 54,000 as conversion works were still being finished. The official opening match was a friendly with Juventus on 7 August with a 2–3 defeat. West Ham's first Premier League match at the stadium was against AFC Bournemouth with an attendance of 56,977. Watford were the first Premier League side to beat West Ham at the London Stadium, overcoming a two-goal deficit to beat West Ham 4–2.

The 2021–22 National League play-off final between Grimsby Town and Solihull Moors to decide who wins promotion to the EFL took place at the London Stadium on 5 June 2022, with the ground standing in for Wembley Stadium the regular venue.

Crowd control

At the beginning of the 2016–17 season, West Ham's games were marred by instances of crowd trouble. In a match against Bournemouth on 21 August, some fans arrived with tickets for seats that did not exist. Fighting also occurred between rival supporters outside the stadium. On 26 August, during a Europa League game against FC Astra Giurgiu, fighting broke out in the stadium with a supporter being arrested on suspicion of causing actual bodily harm. Against Watford, rival fans fought following poor crowd segregation. On 1 October 2016, against Middlesbrough three people were arrested as violent clashes occurred. On 22 October 2016, against Sunderland rival fans confronted each other as Sunderland fans returned to transport taking them home. By 25 October 2016, 23 banning orders had been issued to fans with nine arrests.

There was further crowd trouble on 26 October 2016 during West Ham's EFL Cup fourth-round game against London rivals, Chelsea. Seven people were arrested as police introduced a ban on the sale of alcohol. Plastic bottles, seats, and coins were thrown during West Ham's 2–1 victory. Hundreds of supporters clashed and riot police entered the concourse. West Ham vice-chairman Karren Brady said any supporter identified as having taken part in the violence would receive a lifetime ban. MP Mark Field called for West Ham to play behind closed doors should any further violence occur. In October 2016, football stadium design expert, Paul Fletcher said the stadium should be demolished as he thinks the design means football fans are too far from the pitch. In December 2016, a cameraman working for Arsenal TV was punched in the face by a West Ham supporter towards the end of West Ham's 1–5 defeat by Arsenal.

In March 2018, there were protests against West Ham United owner, David Sullivan at the stadium during a 3–0 home defeat to Burnley. There were four pitch invasions and Sullivan was escorted from his seat before the end of the match. Sullivan was also hit on the head by a coin thrown by one of the supporters. Karren Brady called the events "one of the most painful days" in the club's history. Following the crowd trouble, West Ham banned five supporters for life for invading the pitch. Several people who had thrown coins and other objects were also given lifetime bans. Calling the scenes at the stadium a "disgrace", London mayor, Sadiq Khan said that the crowd trouble had been organised and co-ordinated. An investigation had revealed that over a dozen fights had broken out in the ground between West Ham supporters and that 26 people had attempted to invade the pitch with twenty-two being stopped by stewards. There were 150 separate incidents, including 50 public order offences and 40 assaults. CCTV footage shows a co-ordinated move by a known group of individuals towards the directors' box. Measures including increased security presence and preventing fans from approaching the area holding members of the West Ham board were announced in late March. At a cost of £60,000 funded by the UK taxpayer, the provisions were planned for the next game, against Southampton.

In June 2018, West Ham were charged by the FA with offences relating to crowd disturbances at the game against Burnley in March. In January 2019, West Ham were fined £100,000 for the disturbances. The Football Association investigation of the incidents was heavily critical of the stadium operators, London Stadium 185 (LS185), and found that they had left sections which were damaging to the company out of their report. As LS185 were in control of the stadium's operations and were blamed for their actions in the disturbances (including cutting the number of stewards, poor training and unsatisfactory response to pitch invasions), West Ham sought to split the fine with the company. On 31 October 2018, during West Ham's EFL Cup game against Tottenham Hotspur, further pitch invasions took place with one invader wearing a Scream mask.

Other sports
Cricket
In May 2014 it was announced that Essex County Cricket Club had agreed to a deal "in principle" to play their Twenty20 cricket matches at the stadium. The venue was also touted as a possible venue for the 2019 Cricket World Cup. However, the venue was not included in the final fixtures list. It was not chosen due to the existing facilities running east to west which would have made the game difficult to watch, due to the setting sun, as at most cricket venues the pitch necessarily runs north to south. After investigation, it was discovered that capacity would decrease by 30,000 if they turned the facilities to a north–south alignment. The International Cricket Council additionally had concerns over potential serious injuries to players caused by the raised sand-based outfield.

Baseball

On 8 May 2018, Major League Baseball announced a two-year deal to host a series of baseball games at the London Stadium in 2019 and 2020. The Boston Red Sox and New York Yankees (a major rivalry in the American League) played a two-game series at the stadium from 29 to 30 June 2019, branded as the 2019 MLB London Series. In its baseball configuration, it had a capacity of 66,000; plans were prepared to adjust the seating to emulate the "intimate" experience and amenities of American baseball stadiums, as well as constructing larger locker rooms akin to the clubhouses of U.S. parks. A new playing surface was overlaid on top of the stadium's existing grass.

Prior to the 2019 games, it was announced that the Chicago Cubs and St. Louis Cardinals would play games at London Stadium in 2020; however, this series was ultimately cancelled as the result of the COVID-19 pandemic. The series also did not take place for the following two years but would return in 2023 with the Cardinals hosting the Cubs.

Motorsport

In November 2015 the stadium hosted the 2015 Race of Champions event. It was the first occasion since 2008 that Great Britain hosted the event, with Wembley Stadium last staging the contest in 2008. The English team of Andy Priaulx and Jason Plato won the nations cup whilst Sebastian Vettel took the Champion of Champions crown.

Rugby league

The first rugby league match at the stadium was played between England and New Zealand on 7 November 2015, it was the second test of a three-test series between the sides. The venue also hosted the match between England and Australia as part of the 2016 Rugby League Four Nations. In June 2016, it was announced that the Stadium will form part of England's bid to host the 2021 Rugby League World Cup.

Rugby union

2015 World Cup

In July 2012 the Olympic Park Legacy Company submitted a bid to England Rugby 2015 to host some matches of the 2015 Rugby World Cup. On 2 May 2013, it was officially announced that the Olympic Stadium was due to host four Pool matches during the World Cup and the Bronze final. The first rugby union match at the stadium took place on 29 August 2015 as part of a testing programme ahead of the World Cup. The match featured the first-ever game between the invitational Barbarians side and Samoa. The Barbarians won 27–24, with Samoa having Kane Thompson sent off for punching. The game was delayed when pitch sprinklers came on during the first half.

Premiership Rugby

At fixture launch on 7 July 2017, it was announced that Saracens would host their annual Derby Day'' clash against Harlequins at the London Stadium on 24 March 2018. This was the first time since 2010 that this fixture did not take place at Wembley. The match ended in a 24–11 win for Saracens in front of a crowd of 55,329 and was the first-ever Premiership Rugby match at the stadium. The match was repeated in 2019 which ended as a 27–20 win for Saracens in front of a crowd of 42,717.

Concerts 
Since opening in 2016 the stadium has hosted a number of concerts, with Australian rock band AC/DC playing the first concert on the venue after the Olympic Games.

Access

Rail
The stadium is located in the south of Queen Elizabeth Olympic Park. Stratford and Stratford International railway stations are the main stations nearest to the Olympic Park and are roughly a 20-minute walk to the stadium. Stratford International is served by Southeastern trains on High Speed 1 offering four trains per hour to St Pancras International, as well as other services to Kent, while Stratford station has London Overground services to North, West and South London, and is on the Great Eastern Main Line to London Liverpool Street and East Anglia. Stratford is on London Underground's Jubilee and Central lines to Central London and the Docklands Light Railway (DLR). The DLR offers a direct service to London City Airport. In addition, Hackney Wick (London Overground) and Pudding Mill Lane (DLR) serve the stadium but may be closed during larger events due to capacity limitations. From 2022 Stratford will also be served by Crossrail.

Stations nearby:

Road
Travellers by car are advised to use the public car parks at Westfield Stratford City, Stratford International station, and the Stratford Centre. The Queen Elizabeth Olympic Park also has several docking stations for the London Cycle Hire scheme.

Bus and coach
The following routes serve the London Stadium directly:

A further 17 services use Stratford bus station and Stratford City bus station, which offer a network of services across East London. In addition, route 25 from City Thameslink serves Central London.

National Express coach services to Stratford bus station provide a direct connection to Stansted Airport and several other routes to Essex and East Anglia.

References

External links

 Official website
 London 2012 Olympics profile

2012 establishments in England
Venues of the 2012 Summer Olympics
Athletics venues in London
Football venues in London
Rugby union stadiums in London
Rugby league stadiums in London
Music venues in London
Sports venues in London
Premier League venues
Sports venues completed in 2012
Buildings and structures in the London Borough of Newham
Lee Valley Park
Stratford, London
Athletics (track and field) venues in England
Olympic athletics venues
London
Rugby World Cup stadiums
Sport in the London Borough of Newham
Tourist attractions in the London Borough of Newham
West Ham United F.C.
Queen Elizabeth Olympic Park
2012 Summer Paralympic venues
Populous (company) buildings
Major League Baseball venues
Diamond League venues